The Women's European Volleyball League is a continental volleyball competition for senior women's national volleyball teams of Europe, organized by the European Volleyball Confederation (CEV). Created in 2009, the competition served as a qualifying tournament for the FIVB World Grand Prix (until 2017) and to its successor the FIVB Nations League since 2018.

This event should not be confused with the other, more prestigious, continental competition for European national volleyball teams, the European Volleyball Championship.

Results summary

Medal summary

MVP By Edition
2009 –  Neslihan Demir
2010 –  Jelena Nikolić 
2011 –  Jovana Brakočević 
2012 –  Aneta Havlíčková 
2013 –  Charlotte Leys 
2014 –  Kübra Akman 
2015 –  Renáta Sándor 
2016 –  Polina Rahimova 
2017 –  Anna Stepaniuk
2018 –  Mariya Karakasheva
2019 –  Andrea Kossanyiová
2021 –  Zhana Todorova
2022 –  Lucille Gicquel

See also

 European Men's Volleyball League
 Women's European Volleyball Championship
 FIVB Volleyball World Grand Prix

References

External links
 Official website

 
Recurring sporting events established in 2009
European volleyball records and statistics
Volleyball competitions in Europe
International volleyball competitions
International women's volleyball competitions
Annual sporting events
2009 establishments in Europe